Maṣnaʿat Māriya, is the name of an ancient South Arabian location in Dhamar Governorate, Yemen.

This ancient Himyarite archaeological site is one of the largest in the Yemen. In the local language the name means the fortress of Māriya. The meaning of the word is disputed. The site lies 11 km west of the town of Dhamar. It is important as a large escarpment site partly of late pre-Islamic date. Inside one of the four city gates there is a text written in Sabaic, describes the roads in the area.

External links 

 CSAI Catalog Entry

See also
Zafar, Yemen
Himyarite Kingdom
Rulers of Sheba and Himyar
Ancient history of Yemen

References
Krista Lewis, Space and the Spice of Life: Food, Landscape, and Politics in Ancient Yemen, unpub. Dissertation, Univ. Chicago 2005.
Paul Yule, Late Ḥimyarite Vulture Reliefs, in: eds. W. Arnold, M. Jursa, W. Müller, S. Procházka, Philologisches und Historisches zwischen Anatolien und Sokotra, Analecta Semitica In Memorium Alexander Sima (Wiesbaden 2009), 447–455, 

Archaeological sites in Yemen
Archaeological cultures of the Near East
Former populated places in Southwest Asia